Causapscal Airport  is located  south southwest of Causapscal, Quebec, Canada.

References

External links
Page about this airport on COPA's Places to Fly airport directory

Registered aerodromes in Chaudière-Appalaches